Hawa (English: Wind) is a 2003 Hindi horror film starring Tabu. The film was an unofficial remake of the 1983 American horror film The Entity which starred Barbara Hershey. Hawa was later dubbed into Telugu as Naa Intlo Oka Roju and then in Tamil as Raja Leelai. This was Hansika Motwani's on-screen debut as a child artist.

Plot
The beautiful Sanjana is a divorcee who moves to a hillside house, as she cannot afford a house in the city. To earning her living, she runs her stepfather's antique shop. However, it is not long before strange occurrences begin near and in her home. One day, a Tibetan old lady gives her an antique locket at her antique shop and leaves. Sanjana sells it to a tourist couple for 500 rupees. Sanjana finds the lady on the way to her home to return the money, but she discovers that the lady was dead. The locket is returned to Sanjana by the tourist as the Tibetan lady keeps haunting the couple to make them return it.

Later Sanjana is tortured and physically raped multiple times by an invisible demon first at room then at shower than infront her own kids. Then Her dog also becomes possessed, and attacks her and Vicky, her younger brother. Sanjana consults a psychiatrist who doesn't believe her at first despite telling multiple times. Soon the invisible demon have  a sensual sex with Sanjana, which she gets orgasm but soon regrets for having sex with an invisible being, after while The demon takes away her younger daughter from Sanjana. She calls her psychiatric friend and he brings a parapsychologist. Sanjana comes to learn that the demon comes from an old well, where the tribals used to push down and kill criminals as punishment. Due to lightning striking the well, one soul who was rapist, was thrown in the well and killed, has now escapes and he fell for her lust towards Sanjana. The parapsychologist opens the well from which all the evil spirits come out and attacks him.

Sanjana jumps into the well to bring back her daughter. There all the spirits get combined into a huge demon. Sanjana throws the Tibetan locket to hit the demon, which then dissolves. The soul of Sanjana's father comes as an angel and returns her younger daughter.

Sanjana prepares to leave her house and suddenly the door closes. A demonic voice calls her and she opens the door but finds nothing. Before leaving, her younger daughter suddenly runs to the house and the door closes.

Cast
 Tabu as Sanjana
 Shahbaz Khan as Dr. Asif Ali
 Mukesh Tiwari as Psychiatrist-exorcist (Tantrik)
 Imran Khan as Vicky, Sanjana's brother
 Grusha Kapoor as Pooja (as Grusha Grover)
 Vishwajeet Pradhan as Pooja's husband
 Amit Behl as Vijay, Sanjana's husband
 Avtar Gill as Sanjana's father/ Angel
 Baby Hansika as Sasha, Sanjana's elder daughter
 Baby Bhavika as Misha, Sanjana's younger daughter
 Suresh Chatwal as Real Estate Agent

Critical reception
Taran Adarsh of Bollywood Hungama gave the film 2.5 stars and claimed that 'the film merges two lethal aspects, sex and violence, which should prove a path-breaking exercise for the Hindi viewer.'
Suraj Das of Planet Bollywood, gave the film 2 stars out of 5 and said that 'Self-respecting moviegoers looking for quality film rather than shameful sexual exploitation should steer far clear of this compost.' Anjum N from Rediff, gave the film a negative review and said that 'Tabu is the only saving grace of the movie', and 'it's rather sad that all her effort has been wasted in a movie like Hawa.

References

External links
 

2000s Hindi-language films
Indian supernatural horror films
Indian horror film remakes
2003 films
2003 horror films
Films scored by Surinder Sodhi
Indian remakes of American films
Films directed by Guddu Dhanoa